Miharja LRT station is a Malaysian low-rise rapid transit station situated near and named after Taman Miharja (Malay; English: Miharja Estate). The station is part of the Ampang Line (formerly known as STAR-LINE)

The station was opened on December 16, 1996, as part of the first phase of the STAR system's opening, alongside 13 adjoining stations along the Sultan Ismail-Ampang route.

Location
The Miharja station is situated at the southwestern side of the Miharja Flats, a complex of flats close to Kerayong River in the locality of Taman Miharja, off Jalan Loke Yew (Loke Yew Road). The station directly serves the aforementioned flats, as well as the remaining portion of Taman Miharja and the Ue3 shopping centre from the opposite side of Jalan Loke Yew, which also have similarly close access to Maluri station.

The Miharja station was constructed along two leveled tracks, reusing the now defunct Federated Malay States Railway and Malayan Railway route between Kuala Lumpur, Ampang and Salak South. The station is also the last station from the Ampang terminal before a convergence with the Putra Heights-bound line and the Chan Sow Lin interchange, 850 metres northward, where the lines merge to form the common route of the Ampang and Sri Petaling Lines towards Sentul Timur station.

Design

Overall, the Miharja station was built as a low-rise station along two tracks for trains traveling in opposite direction. Because the station is nearly subsurface and features two side platforms, the station designates individual ticketing areas for each of the station's two platforms at their level, ensuring access to trains traveling the opposite direction is not freely possible.

The principal styling of the station is similar to most other stations in the line, featuring curved roofs supported by latticed frames, and white plastered walls and pillars. Because stairways are only used to link street level with the station's ticket areas and platforms, the station is not accommodative to disabled users.

See also

 List of rail transit stations in Klang Valley

External links 
Miharja LRT Station - mrt.com.my

1996 establishments in Malaysia
Ampang Line
Railway stations opened in 1996
Rapid transit stations in Kuala Lumpur